Rock Love is a half live / half (sixth) studio album by American rock band Steve Miller Band. The album was released in September 1971, and compiled by Capitol Records. All of Miller's previous backing band had left following the recording of the previous album, save bassist Bobby Winkelman. They were replaced by members of Winkelman's previous group, the psychedelic rock band Frumious Bandersnatch for this record, including Ross Valory (a future member of Journey) on bass, and Jack King on drums. Bobby Winkelman was in the band (having moved back to rhythm guitar) during the live recordings on the album's first side, but is not credited on the album cover. David Denny, who later joined the band in 1976, is a guest guitarist (again, not credited) on "Blues Without Blame".

The album consists of three blues-rock tracks recorded live, including lengthy jam-style "Love Shock" which lasts nearly 12 minutes and includes an extensive drum solo, and four studio tracks. The first song starts with the words "I'm going to play you some blues 'cos I know you like that", but some critics disagreed, criticising the album's songs as "generic white-boy blueisms". Unlike Miller's previous five albums, this album was a commercial failure.

Track listing
All tracks written by Steve Miller.

Personnel
Steve Miller – lead guitar, vocals
Ross Valory – bass guitar
Jack King – drums
Bobby Winkelman – rhythm guitar (1–3) (not credited)
Tracks 1–2 were recorded live in Hollywood, Florida.
Track 3 was recorded live in Pasadena, California.

Charts
Album - Billboard (United States)

References

1971 albums
Steve Miller Band albums
Capitol Records albums